Alen Kozić (born September 27, 1976) is a retired Major League Soccer player.

Raised in Tampa, Florida, from the age of three, he was the son of professional soccer player, Refik Kozić, and mother Svetlana. He began his career in the youth soccer organization in Tampa, playing for Temple Terrace Spirit and scoring the winning goal in the 1993 Don Greer Cup Youth Soccer U-17 National Championship.

Having received offers from various universities, Kozić decided on and played for Florida International University from 1995 to 1997. In his sophomore & junior years, he achieved a place in the NCAA Division I Men's Soccer All-American First Team. As a junior he finished as a runner up for the Hermann Trophy, as the best college player 1997. After the completion of the College soccer season in December and halfway through his junior year, Kozic left FIU to sign his first professional contract with SV Austria Salzburg in the Austrian Bundesliga at the age of 20. In may of 1998, Kozic was recruited and signed by MLS side Miami Fusion where he spent 1998-2000.

Halfway through his rookie season after playing against Dallas Burn, the next game against the New York Metro stars, Kozić tore his ACL and spent the rest of the season sidelined.  He played two seasons with Miami Fusion before heading to Europe to play.

In 2000, he played one season for NK Istra 1961 in Pula, Croatia before being bought by Fortuna Düsseldorf in 2000. Fortuna loaned him out to Union Berlin where he remained in the German 3rd division for 5 years until 2006.  After several successful seasons, he decided to return to the United States to retire and finish his education.

Kozić currently has a master's degree in Business from the University of South Florida and a master's degree in Entrepreneurship also from the University of South Florida. He currently lives in Tampa and runs his own business.

References

External links
 

1976 births
Living people
Footballers from Belgrade
FIU Panthers men's soccer players
Miami Fusion players
American soccer players
Major League Soccer players
NK Istra 1961 players
1. FC Union Solingen players
MLS Pro-40 players
A-League (1995–2004) players
Soccer players from Tampa, Florida
Association football wingers
All-American men's college soccer players
People from Temple Terrace, Florida
University of South Florida alumni
Sportspeople from Hillsborough County, Florida
American expatriate soccer players
American expatriate sportspeople in Austria
American expatriate sportspeople in Croatia
American expatriate soccer players in Germany
Expatriate footballers in Austria
Expatriate footballers in Croatia